Gorinchem ( or ), also spelled Gorkum, is a city and municipality in the western Netherlands, in the province of South Holland.

The municipality of Gorinchem also includes the population centre of Dalem.

History 

It is assumed that Gorinchem was founded circa 1000 CE by fishermen and farmers on the raised land near the mouth of the river Linge at the Merwede. "Goriks Heem" (Home of Gorik) is first mentioned in a document from 1224 in which Floris IV granted people from Gorinchem exemption of toll payments throughout Holland.

Somewhere between 1247 and 1267, Gorinchem became property of the Lords of Arkel. At the end of the 13th century earthen mounts reinforced with palisades were built around the settlement to protect it from domination by the neighboring counties of Holland and Gelre. Half a century later real city walls were built complete with 7 gates and 23 watchtowers. Otto van Arkel granted it city rights on 11 November 1322.

Jan van Arkel had a dispute with Albert I, brother of Willem V of Holland, leading to war and subsequently to the annexation of Gorinchem to Holland in 1417. This resulted in increased trade and Gorinchem grew to be the eighth city of Holland.

On 9 July 1572, the Watergeuzen (Dutch rebels against Spanish rule) conquered the city and captured 19 Catholic priests and monks.  Because they refused to renounce their faith, these priests and monks were brought to Brielle where they were hanged and were from then on known among Catholics as the Martyrs of Gorkum.

By the 16th century, the city walls were so deteriorated that they were replaced with new fortifications and eleven bastions that still are almost completely intact. The new walls were completed in 1609 and were located further from the town centre, making the city twice as large. In 1673, Gorinchem became part of the old Dutch Water Line.

The city walls had four city gates: the Arkel Gate in the north, the Dalem Gate in the east, the Water Gate in the south (where the ferry to Woudrichem was), and the Kansel Gate in the west. Of these four gates, only the Dalem Gate remains. The others were removed in the 19th century to make way for vehicular traffic. A portion of the Water Gate was preserved in the gardens of the Rijksmuseum in Amsterdam.

In the 18th century, the economy went into decline. After the French domination, the retreating French troops took station in the bastion fortress of Gorinchem. After a three-month siege they capitulated but the city was heavily damaged.

During the Industrial Revolution, Gorinchem recovered. Increased shipping led to new canals being dug and a railway connection to the city. Its population quickly increased, filling the innercity, and new neighbourhoods had to be built outside the city walls.

At the beginning of the 20th century, expansion took place in the Lingewijk and West neighbourhoods. After World War II, expansion started in the north-western portion of the municipality which was completed in the 1970s. This was followed by developments of the neighbourhoods Wijdschild and Laag Dalem east of the city center. In 1986, the town Dalem was added to the municipality.

In August 2021 ANWB named Gorinchem the most beautiful star fort in the Netherlands.

Demographics 
Gorinchem had 37,456 inhabitants on 1 January 2021.

Politics 
The current mayor of Gorinchem is Reinie Melissant-Briene of the CDA. The municipal executive consists of the City Interest, Democrats Gorinchem, PvdA and CDA.

The municipal council of Gorinchem has 25 members, which are directly elected. The composition of the municipal council as of the 2018 Dutch municipal elections is as shown in the table below.

Transport

The city is crossed by two motorways; the A15 on the northside, and the A27 on the westside.

The city also has a railway station: Gorinchem.

Notable natives and residents

Public thinking & public service 
 John V, Lord of Arkel (1362–1428) stadtholder of Holland, Zeeland and West Frisia
 Henry of Gorkum (ca.1378– 1431) a Dutch theologian
 Willem Hessels van Est (1542–1613) a Dutch Catholic theologian
 The Martyrs of Gorkum  a group of 19 Dutch Catholic clerics who were hanged in 1572
 Thomas van Erpe (1584–1624) a Dutch Orientalist, published a book of Arabic grammar 
 Dirk Rafelsz Camphuysen (1586–1627) theologian, poet, painter 
 Johannes van Neercassel (1625–1686) Archbishop of Utrecht 1661 to 1686. 
 Hendrik Hamel (1630–1692) seafarer and writer 
 Aegidius van Braam (1758–1822) a Dutch naval vice-admiral
 Pierre van Paassen (1895–1968) a Dutch–Canadian-American journalist, writer, and Unitarian minister
 Roger van Boxtel (born 1954) a retired Dutch politician and businessman, lives in Gorinchem

The Arts 
 Abraham Bloemaert (1566–1651) Dutch painter and printmaker in etching and engraving 
 Anthonie Verstraelen (1593/1594-1641) a Dutch landscape painter of winter scenes
 Aert van der Neer (ca.1603–1677) a Dutch Golden Age landscape painter 
 Cornelis Saftleven (ca.1607–1681) a Dutch painter, worked in many genres
 Jacob van der Ulft (1621–1689) a Dutch painter, glass painter, print artist, architect and Mayor of Gorinchem 1660 to 1679
 Hendrik Verschuring (1627–1690) a Dutch Golden Age landscape painter
 Jan van der Heyden (1637–1712) a Dutch Baroque-era painter, glass painter, draughtsman and printmaker
 Ida Gerhardt (1905–1997) a classicist and Dutch poet of a post-symbolist tradition
 A. Teeuw (1921–2012) a Dutch critic of Indonesian literature
 Jan van Munster (born 1939) a Dutch sculptor and installation artist
 Dinand Woesthoff (born 1972) a Dutch musician, lead singer with Dutch band Kane
 Nikos Vertis (born 1976) a Greek singer
 Boaz de Jong (born 1988) stage name Boaz van de Beatz, a Dutch record producer and DJ
 Chu Lan-ting (born 1990) stage name Diana Wang, a Dutch-born Taiwanese singer and film actress

Science & Business 
 Gerard Boate (1604–1650) physician and author of The Natural History of Ireland  and his brother 
 Arnold Boate (1606–1653) a Dutch physician and Hebrew scholar 
 Louis Jérôme Reiche (1799–1890) a French merchant, manufacturer and entomologist
 Berend George Escher (1885–1967) a Dutch geologist and vulcanologist
 Frans Michel Penning (1894–1953) a Dutch experimental physicist

Sport 
 Ab Oord (1885–1961) a Dutch weightlifter, competed at the 1924 Summer Olympics
 Hadriaan van Nes (born 1942) a retired rower, team silver medallist at the 1968 Summer Olympics
 Ruud Brood (born 1962) a football manager and former player with over 300 club caps
 Arie Loef (born 1969) a retired speed skater, competed at the 1992 and 1994 Winter Olympics
 Marco van Hoogdalem (born 1972) a retired Dutch football player with over 350 club caps
 Henk Norel (born 1987) a Dutch basketball player, 79 games with the Netherlands national basketball team
 Frenkie de Jong (born 1997) a Dutch football player who is currently playing for FC Barcelona.

International relations
Gorinchem is twinned with

Gallery

References

External links

Official website

 
Municipalities of South Holland
Populated places in South Holland
Alblasserwaard